Sofia Arvidsson and Johanna Larsson were the defending champions, but Larsson decided not to participate this year. Arvidsson partnered with Marina Erakovic, but lost in the first round to Jamie Hampton and Anna Tatishvili.

Raquel Kops-Jones and Abigail Spears won the title, defeating Hampton and Tatishvili 6–1, 3–6, [10–6] in the final.

Seeds

Draw

References
Main Draw

Challenge Bell
Tournoi de Québec
Can